Jonathan Miles (born January 28, 1971) is an American journalist and novelist.  His debut novel, Dear American Airlines, was published by Houghton Mifflin Harcourt in 2008. The novel, written in the form of a complaint letter to the titular airline, was reviewed by Richard Russo in The New York Times Book Review. His second novel, Want Not, was published by Houghton Mifflin Harcourt in 2013.

Early life
Jonathan Miles was born in Cleveland, Ohio; his family moved to Phoenix, Arizona, but Miles ran away when he was 17, moving to Oxford, Mississippi, eventually attending the University of Mississippi and taking a writing class with Barry Hannah. Finding work as a newspaper reporter and aspiring jazz musician, Miles met novelist Larry Brown. The two became friends, and while Miles didn't graduate "Ole Miss", Brown taught and encouraged Miles to write: "It was an astonishing education. Some people go to the Iowa Writer's Workshop. I had Larry."

Literary career
While Miles never studied journalism in college, his work soon found publication in a local literary magazine, the Oxford American, and he continued to contribute essays and critique for several years. A friend suggested Miles apply as a reporter for The Oxford Eagle, and while the pay wasn't good, being forced to churn out daily copy gradually improved his ability to write more dispassionately about complex and emotional subjects. Miles claims he was fired by the paper years later for writing an obituary about a subject who had admitted regularly providing bootlegged liquor to noted Oxford resident William Faulkner and correctly reporting the fact.

Fortunately, Miles's writing caught the eye of Esquire editor Will Blythe, who published an account Miles wrote of an ingenious prison escape he'd investigated while writing for the Oxford paper. Miles soon developed a reputation as a keen observer of Mississippi culture, selling essays to Food & Wine, Men's Journal and The New York Times Magazine. He credits his early literary voice to his time in Oxford, Mississippi, but when Men's Journal offered him an annual contract Miles was already driving a moving van toward New York City in search of such an opportunity.

Miles's novel Dear American Airlines received the following honors:
 The New York Times Book Review 100 notable books of 2008 (one of seven debut novels to be included)
 The Wall Street Journal dozen "most memorable" books of 2008
 Los Angeles Times favorite books of 2008
 Amazon.ca top 50 editors' picks for 2008 (#27)
 A.V. Club favorite books of 2008

Works
 Dear American Airlines (Boston: Houghton Mifflin Harcourt, 2008) 
 Want Not (Boston: Houghton Mifflin Harcourt, 2013) 
 Anatomy of a Miracle (Hogarth, 2018)

References

External links
 
 Los Angeles Times
 https://www.npr.org/2008/06/28/91993801/fictional-airline-passenger-disgruntled-with-life

21st-century American novelists
American male novelists
1971 births
Living people
21st-century American male writers